Lapule Tamean (born 17 September 1962) is a Papua New Guinean sprinter. He competed in the men's 200 metres at the 1984 Summer Olympics.

References

External links

1962 births
Living people
Athletes (track and field) at the 1984 Summer Olympics
Papua New Guinean male sprinters
Olympic athletes of Papua New Guinea
Athletes (track and field) at the 1982 Commonwealth Games
Commonwealth Games competitors for Papua New Guinea
Place of birth missing (living people)